Jordan Hill (born November 14, 1990) is an American politician who served as a member of the West Virginia House of Delegates for the 41st district from 2014 to 2020.

References

1990 births
Living people
Republican Party members of the West Virginia House of Delegates
21st-century American politicians